Richard Howitt may refer to:

 Richard Howitt (poet) (1799–1869), British poet
 Richard Howitt (cricketer, born 1864) (1864–1951), English cricketer
 Richard Howitt (cricketer, born 1977), English cricketer
 Richard Howitt (politician) (born 1961), British politician and CEO